Events in the year 1656 in Norway.

Incumbents
Monarch: Frederick III

Events

27 February - The first Lindesnes Lighthouse was established, it was the first lighthouse in Norway.
Niels Trolle is appointed Steward of Norway.

Arts and literature
Halsnøy Kloster, a prospect of Halsnøy Abbey was painted by Elias Fiigenschoug, it is regarded as the first Norwegian landscape painting.
 The construction of Austrått Manor is finished..

Births

Full date unknown
Hans Paus, priest and poet (d.1715).

Deaths

See also

References